Laurie Throness (born 1958) is a Canadian politician, who was elected to the Legislative Assembly of British Columbia in the 2013 provincial election. He represented the electoral district of Chilliwack-Kent as a member of the British Columbia Liberal Party. After making controversial remarks regarding the NDP's free contraception plan, he resigned from the BC Liberal Party caucus on October 15, 2020.  He ran as an independent candidate in the 2020 BC general election.  Before becoming a politician, Throness earned a place at the University of Cambridge where he studied for a Ph.D in History. After Cambridge, he went on to  publish a book in 2008 on the theological origins of the Penitentiary Act of 1779.

Throness was previously the party's candidate in the electoral district of Chilliwack-Hope in a by-election in 2012, following the resignation of Barry Penner, but was defeated by Gwen O'Mahony of the New Democrats. He defeated O'Mahony in the 2013 general election, capturing 49.15% of votes cast compared to her 36.01% share of the vote. The BC Conservative candidate received 10.77% of the votes, and the Green Party candidate received 4.07%.

Political views and controversy 
Throness has leaned towards conservative political and social views, and has made anti-LGBTQ comments. In July 2020 he defended advertising in the socially conservative Christian lifestyle magazine, The Light Magazine. The magazine routinely hosts articles supporting conversion therapy, which attempts to "convert" individuals to a heterosexual orientation and treats same sex attraction as a mental illness. Throness was defiant, stating "he would advertise in the magazine again because it aligns with his values as a “Biblical Christian” and it’s an important way to reach his constituents."

In an online all-candidates meeting on October 14, 2020, prior to the 2020 British Columbia general election, Throness compared the NDP's plan for free birth control to eugenics, the discredited theory of selective mating for "desirable" traits. Throness was quoted as saying "And maybe they’ll have fewer babies so there will be fewer poor people in the future. And to me, that contains an odour that I don’t like and so I don’t really support what the NDP is doing there and that’s my answer.” Following his comments he was removed from the BC Liberal Party's candidate slate, but continued to campaign for reelection as an independent before being defeated by NDP candidate Kelli Paddon.

Electoral record

Notes

References

British Columbia Liberal Party MLAs
Members of the Christian and Missionary Alliance
Living people
21st-century Canadian politicians
Year of birth uncertain
1958 births